Trail of Terror is a 1943 American Western film written and directed by Oliver Drake. The film stars Dave O'Brien, James Newill, Guy Wilkerson, Patricia Knox, Jack Ingram and I. Stanford Jolley. The film was released on September 7, 1943, by Producers Releasing Corporation.

Plot

Cast          
Dave O'Brien as Tex Wyatt / Curly Wyatt 
James Newill as Jim Steele 
Guy Wilkerson as Panhandle Perkins
Patricia Knox as Belle Blaine
Jack Ingram as Nevada Simmons
I. Stanford Jolley as Hank
Budd Buster as Monte
Robert F. Hill as Captain Curtis 
Frank Ellis as Joe
Kenne Duncan as Tom

See also
The Texas Rangers series:
 The Rangers Take Over (1942)
 Bad Men of Thunder Gap (1943)
 West of Texas (1943)
 Border Buckaroos (1943)
 Fighting Valley (1943)
 Trail of Terror (1943)
 The Return of the Rangers (1943)
 Boss of Rawhide (1943)
 Outlaw Roundup (1944)
 Guns of the Law (1944)
 The Pinto Bandit (1944)
 Spook Town (1944)
 Brand of the Devil (1944)
 Gunsmoke Mesa (1944)
 Gangsters of the Frontier (1944)
 Dead or Alive (1944)
 The Whispering Skull (1944)
 Marked for Murder (1945)
 Enemy of the Law (1945)
 Three in the Saddle (1945)
 Frontier Fugitives (1945)
 Flaming Bullets (1945)

References

External links
 

1943 films
American Western (genre) films
1943 Western (genre) films
Producers Releasing Corporation films
Films directed by Oliver Drake
American black-and-white films
1940s English-language films
1940s American films